Lamsu Kola (also Romanized as Lamsū Kolā and Lamsū Kalā; also known as Samsū Kolā) is a village in Firuzjah Rural District, Bandpey-ye Sharqi District, Babol County, Mazandaran Province, Iran. At the 2006 census, its population was 100, in 28 families.

References 

Populated places in Babol County